Drimycarpus maximus is a tree of Borneo in the cashew and sumac family Anacardiaceae. The specific epithet  is from the Latin meaning "greatest", referring to the large leaves and fruits.

Description
Its smooth bark is coloured grey.

Distribution and habitat
Drimycarpus maximus is endemic to Borneo, where it is confined to Sarawak. Its habitat is mixed dipterocarp forests.

References

Anacardiaceae
Endemic flora of Borneo
Trees of Borneo
Flora of Sarawak
Plants described in 1996
Flora of the Borneo lowland rain forests